Garald G. Parker Sr. (1905–2000) was a hydrologist and is known as the "Father of Florida groundwater hydrology." Parker also named the principal artesian aquifer the Floridan Aquifer.

Education 
Bachelor's degree with studies in Geology and Biology from Central Washington State College. Graduate School at the University of Washington.

Career

School teacher 
Parker taught in the public schools for 10 years prior to graduating from college.

U.S. Geological Survey 
In 1940, Parker began his career as a hydrogeologist when he made a cross-country trip to help save the water supply of Miami, Florida from saltwater intrusion. Parker developed protective measures to save well fields and also from 1940 to 1947 identified and named the Biscayne Aquifer, the Floridan Aquifer and defined the geologic structure of southern Florida. Parker was also a mentor to Marjory Stoneman Douglas on the water of the Everglades for her 1947 book, The Everglades: River of Grass. Parker also discovered the Peninsular Florida Hydrologic Divide which results in the southern portion of Florida being entirely dependent on rainfall for its freshwater. 
From 1948 to 1949, Parker was assigned to the Hanford Atomic Energy Resource/Reservation in Richmond, Washington. 
From 1949 to 1955, he was located in the Washington headquarters in both the Ground Water Branch and later in the general hydrology branch. 
From 1956 to 1959, he led the multi-agency Delaware River Basin study.
From 1960-1965 Parker was assigned to Denver, Colorado where he was in charge of the arid lands research effort.
From 1966-1969 he was the District Chief for the state of New York.

SW Florida Water Management District 
In 1969 he served as the first hydrologist and senior scientist for the Southwest Florida Water Management District until  1975. Afterwards, he worked as a consultant, in Florida and also internationally, into the 1990s.

Private consulting 
From 1975-1988, he entered private consulting practice where he has concentrated his efforts up until 1988 where he retired again.

In a March 17, 1989 interview with his son, Garald Jr. Parker had this to say:

See also 
Floridan Aquifer
"The Swamp: The Everglades, Florida, and the Politics of Paradise" By Michael Grunwald, published 2006.

References
U.S. Geological Survey

External links
 Dr. Garald Gordon Parker Collection at the University of South Florida

1905 births
2000 deaths
American hydrologists
People from Florida